Throckenholt is a village in the civil parish of Sutton St Edmund (where the population is listed) in the South Holland district of Lincolnshire, England.

The Museum of Technology, The Great War and WWII is in the village and opened its doors in 2016.

Throckenholt Priory was sited here, it was a hermitage and chapel in existence from at least  1107–1540. It was granted to Thorney Abbey by Nigel, Bishop of Ely.

Throckenholt was written as 'Trokenholt' in the 1240 Papal Rolls.

References

Villages in Lincolnshire
South Holland, Lincolnshire